Two national Freedom Trains have toured the United States: the 1947–49 special exhibit Freedom Train and the 1975–76 American Freedom Train which celebrated the United States Bicentennial.  Each train had its own special red, white and blue paint scheme and its own itinerary and route around the 48 contiguous states, stopping to display Americana and related historical artifacts.

The 1940s Freedom Train exhibit was integrated—black and white viewers were allowed to mingle freely. When town officials in Birmingham, Alabama, and Memphis, Tennessee, refused to allow blacks and whites to see the exhibits at the same time, the Freedom Train skipped the planned visits, amid significant controversy.

The 1947–1949 Freedom Train

The first Freedom Train was proposed in April 1946 by Attorney General Tom C. Clark, who believed that Americans had begun taking the principles of liberty for granted in the post-war years. The idea was adopted by a coalition that included Paramount Pictures and the Advertising Council, which had just changed its name from "War Advertising Council".

Plans and messaging 
Thomas D'Arcy Brophy (of advertising firm Kenyon & Eckhardt) described the Freedom Train as "a campaign to sell America to Americans". The Advertising Council planned an assortment of other events to accompany the Train, including messages in radio programs, comic books, and films. In each city where the train stopped, they organized a "Rededication Week" for public celebrations of the United States. In February 1947, the group formed the "American Heritage Foundation" and named Brophy its president.

The Board of Trustees for the new foundation included:
 Winthrop W. Aldrich (chairman), president of Chase National Bank and brother-in-law of J. D. Rockefeller Jr.;
 Chester Barnard, chairman of the Rockefeller Foundation;
 John Foster Dulles, then a lawyer and Republican political advisor, soon to become the U.S. Secretary of State;
 Paul G. Hoffman, CEO of Studebaker automobile company, administrator of the Marshall Plan, and soon-to-be President of the Ford Foundation;
Eric Johnston, former President of the U.S. Chamber of Commerce and president of the Motion Picture Association of America;
 Reinhold Niebuhr, prominent theologian; and 
 Charles E. Wilson, CEO of the General Electric Company and soon to be chief of the Office of Defense Mobilization—sometimes described as "co-president" of the United States under Truman.

The Board of Trustees did not include any African-Americans until after the train had launched. Walter White, Lester Granger, and A. Philip Randolph were proposed and rejected as candidates for membership. Frederick D. Patterson, president of Tuskegee Institute and founder of the United Negro College Fund was named as a trustee in October 1947.

American Federation of Labor President William Green and Congress of Industrial Organizations President Philip Murray were vice presidents of the Foundation.

The National Archives supplied the train with key documents, while, as archivist Elizabeth Hamer noted in August 1947, "Hollywood, chiefly, is putting up the capital for this exhibit." The Foundation rejected the list of documents proposed by the National Archives, which included documents such as Executive Order 8802. Contrary to the wishes of the Justice Department, the Foundation excluded collective bargaining from the list of citizens' rights. In the final roster, the only document pertaining to black history was the Emancipation Proclamation—and even in this case, accompanying commentary focused on the white president Abraham Lincoln who issued the document. The Train also displayed a letter from Christopher Columbus, the Mayflower Compact, and documents of German and Japanese surrender from World War II.

While preparing for the tour, the planners decided to downplay comparisons of the United States with Nazis, as well as direct calls for foreign intervention. Instead they sought to focus on crafting a shared ideology for Americans. Clark wrote, "Indoctrination in democracy is the essential catalytic agent needed to blend our various groups into one American family. Without it, we could not sustain the continuity of our way of life. In its largest sense, preaching Americanism is an affirmative declaration of our faith in ourselves."

The Train displayed exhibits such as "Good Citizen", which portrayed men wearing suits  Exhibits also defined American freedoms in terms of consumerism and boasted of superior commodity production. For women (more often referred to as "girls" or "sisters"), good citizenship was defined in terms of clothing, participation in certain acceptable community activities, and raising children.

Execution 

An ALCO PA diesel-electric locomotive pulled the train, which carried the original versions of the United States Constitution, Declaration of Independence, Truman Doctrine, and the Bill of Rights on its tour of more than 300 cities in all 48 states. As Alaska and Hawaii did not gain statehood until 1959, this train toured all of the U.S. states that existed at the time. It was the first train to visit all 48 contiguous states (the 1936 Rexall Train had come close, but missed Nevada).

Top Marines were selected to attend to the train and its famous documents.  The Marine contingent was led by Col. Robert F. Scott. According to attendees Mark and Mary Ellen Murphy:

"With polite and firm prodding the Marines hurried through as many as 1200 persons an hour, giving each an average of three seconds to look at each exhibit. As they shuffled through the beige-and-green cars, they listened to regional and patriotic music played over a public address system and to a 'move faster' exhortation by a suave Marine voice which came through the speaker every time a record changed."

The Freedom Train even had an official song, written by Irving Berlin and performed by Bing Crosby and the Andrews Sisters.

The train's first public display stop occurred in Philadelphia, Pennsylvania, on September 17, 1947. From there, the train traveled in a route that took it up to New England, down the Atlantic coast to Florida, across the nation's southern states to California, up the Pacific coast to Washington, then across the northern states to Minnesota. After touring the perimeter of the nation, the train moved inland from Minnesota to Colorado then Kansas and Missouri, north to Wisconsin, then south to the Ohio River valley, north again to Michigan and finally east to New Jersey. The train's official tour end occurred on January 22, 1949 in Washington, D.C., nearly three months after its last public display October 26, 1948, in Havre de Grace, Maryland. A notable stop on the train's itinerary was its appearance at the Chicago Railroad Fair from July 5 – 9, 1948.

The American Heritage Foundation gave licenses to some vendors to sell Freedom Train gear such as books and postcards, while barring unauthorized merchants from selling other Freedom paraphernalia.

The white press favored the train with mostly positive coverage. One exception was John O'Donnell, who commented in the Washington Times-Herald: "... we understand a committee headed by Winthrop Alrich, son-in-law of John D. Rockefeller Jr., is launching the campaign. Their wayward historical bus is scheduled to depart with great huzzahs from the White House ... Hold on to your hats, boys, you're going for another ride and remember to keep the moths out of that uniform."

In the view of the Advertising Council, the Freedom Train succeeded, especially through the local rallies and media messages which accompanied it. This multifaceted project thus became a model for future efforts in the Cold War.

Conflict over segregation 

The announcement of the Freedom Train plan on May 22, 1947, provoked spirited commentary on the state of Freedom in Black America. Black American poet Langston Hughes wrote a critical poem, "Freedom Train", in which he described the Freedom Train passing through the segregated southern states, where black and white passengers rode in separate cars. The poem was famously recorded by Paul Robeson. Facing a public relations backlash and seeking to brand the Western Bloc as more free than its counterpart, the Truman administration announced in September 1947 a policy of desegregation for the train, scheduled to depart only two weeks later.

Mayor James J. Pleasants Jr., of Memphis, Tennessee announced that black and white people would be allowed to visit the Freedom Train only during separate visiting hours. (Pleasants acted with the support of Boss Edward H. Crump, the most influential figure in Memphis politics during the former half of the twentieth century.) When Freedom Train organizers then canceled the train's planned stop in Memphis, Mayor Pleasants responded that segregated viewing hours were necessary to avert "race trouble" that would inevitably result from interracial "jostling and pushing". To Freedom Train stops in other cities, the mayor's office sent undercover agents, who reported that, first, some other southern cities had enforced segregation during viewing, and furthermore, that white patrons of the Freedom Train elsewhere had disliked the presence of Black Americans.

In Montgomery, Alabama, agitation by Edgar Nixon and Rosa Parks resulted in the appointment of black members to the local Freedom Train planning committee and a promise of desegregation during the train's visit.

In Birmingham, Alabama, protest from public safety commissioner Bull Connor insisted that black and white people would wait for the train in separate lines and take turns entering. The idea behind the "Birmingham Plan" was that whites and blacks would technically be on board the train at the same time, without having to encounter each other directly. Under pressure, Connors and his colleague James E. Morgan stated:

Our segregation law is for the protection of the white and black races in the city, and for the prevention of disorders. . . . It is not a mantle to be set aside at the instance of this or that visitor to the city. If those in charge of the Freedom Train should see fit to bring it to Birmingham, they will be welcomed cordially, but cannot expect that either they or visitors to the Freedom Train will be exempt from our laws.

Under pressure and threat of boycott by various organizations including the NAACP, the American Heritage Foundation also canceled the Freedom Train's appearance in Birmingham. The episode was somewhat embarrassing for collaborationist local black leaders Ernest Taggart and I. J. Israel, who defended their support of the segregated Freedom Train visit in the spirit of compromise.

Public critique of the Train continued during the tour. The Sunday Oregonian published a two-page section titled "No Premium Fares on Freedom Train—But Actually Some Citizens Still Ride Second Class", detailing persistent discrimination and violence against Black Americans. These and other rumblings were described by FBI Director J. Edgar Hoover as "Negro Communist" agitation.

The 1975–76 American Freedom Train

[[File:Freedom train in ga7.jpg|thumb|Southern Pacific 4449 stopping in Georgia in 1976 while pulling the American Freedom Train]]

A second freedom train, the American Freedom Train, toured the country in 1975–76 to commemorate the United States Bicentennial.
This 26-car train was powered by three newly restored steam locomotives. The first to pull the train was the former Reading Company T-1 class 4-8-4 #2101. The second was the former Southern Pacific 4449, a large 4-8-4 steam locomotive that is still operating in special excursion service today. The third was the former Texas & Pacific 2-10-4 #610, which pulled the train in Texas. Due to light rail loadings and track conditions on the Louisville and Nashville Railroad, diesels hauled the train from New Orleans to Mobile, Alabama. Diesels were also required in Chicago after the steam locomotive derailed attempting to negotiate tracks by the Chicago lakefront.

The train itself consisted of 10 display cars, converted from New York Central and Penn Central baggage cars. They carried more than 500 treasures of Americana, including George Washington's copy of the Constitution, the original Louisiana Purchase, Judy Garland's dress from The Wizard of Oz, Joe Frazier's boxing trunks, Martin Luther King Jr.'s pulpit and robes, replicas of Jesse Owens's four Olympic gold medals from 1936 (one of which was stolen somewhere along the way), a pair of Wilt Chamberlain's basketball shoes, and a rock from the Moon.

Its tour of all 48 contiguous states lasted from April 1, 1975, until December 31, 1976. More than 7 million Americans visited the train during its tour, while millions more stood trackside to see it go by.

The tour began in Wilmington, Delaware, and headed northeast to New England, west through Pennsylvania, Ohio to Michigan, then around Lake Michigan to Illinois and Wisconsin.  From the Midwest, the tour continued westward, zigzagging across the plains to Utah and then up to the Pacific Northwest.  From Seattle, Washington, the tour then traveled south along the Pacific coast to southern California.  The train and crew spent Christmas 1975 in Pomona, California, decorating the locomotive with a large profile of Santa Claus on the front of the smokebox above the front coupler.  For 1976, the tour continued from southern California eastward through Arizona, New Mexico and Texas, then turned north to visit Kansas and Missouri before traveling through the Gulf Coast states and then north again to Pennsylvania.  The tour continued southeast to New Jersey then south along the Atlantic coast before finally ending December 26, 1976, in Miami, Florida. The last visitor went through the train on December 31, 1976.

In early 1977, National Museums of Canada bought 15 of the cars and used them from 1978 to 1980 on a rail tour across Canada as the Discovery Train, a mobile museum focusing on that country's history.

See also
 Freedom Bell, American Legion traveled on the American Freedom Train alongside a Lunar Rover test article.
 Crusade for Freedom; a Cold War public relations effort following the first Freedom Train.

 References 

 Bibliography 
 Wall, Wendy L.  Inventing the "American Way":  The Politics of Consensus from the New Deal to the Civil Rights Movement.  Oxford University Press, 2008.  
 Green, Laurie B. Battling the Plantation Mentality: Memphis and the Black Freedom Struggle". University of North Carolina Press, 2007.  Little, Stuart J. "The Freedom Train: Citizenship and Postwar Political Culture 1946-1949", American Studies 34(1), Spring 1993, pp. 35–67. Accessed via JStor, 1 September 2014.
 McGinnis, John Vianney. "The Advertising Council and the Cold War". Dissertation at Syracuse University, accepted May 15, 1991.
 White, John. "Civil Rights in Conflict: The "Birmingham plan" and the Freedom Train, 1947", Alabama Review'' 52(2), April 1999.

External links
 The Story of 1947–1949 Freedom Train and the 1975–1976 Bicentennial American Freedom Train
 . Lincoln Highway Museum & Archives
 ThemeTrains.com – Information on both Freedom Trains, DVD documentaries, decals for modeling the '76 train in HO and N scales.

History of rail transportation in the United States
History of racial segregation in the United States
United States Bicentennial
1947 in the United States
1948 in the United States
1949 in the United States
1975 in the United States
1976 in the United States